Snow in the southern part of Louisiana presents a rare and serious problem because of South Louisiana’s subtropical climate. For snow to push into the southern region of Louisiana, extreme weather conditions for the area must be present, usually a low-pressure system coupled with unusually low temperatures. Due to the infrequency of these cold weather patterns, southern areas affected in this state are often unprepared to deal with slick streets and freezing temperatures.

According to the National Weather Service, measurable snowfall amounts occur on an average of only once every other year in Northwest Louisiana; many consecutive years may pass with no measurable snowfall. This fell on the 21st and 22nd, and one-half inch remained on the ground December 25th, making this the only Christmas Day of record with snow on the ground. In 1948, 12.4 inches of snow was measured for the month of January for the greatest monthly amount on record. Occasional ice and sleet storms do considerable damage to trees, power and telephone lines, as well as make travel very difficult.

Notable events

However, these are unconfirmed.

1899: With the Great Blizzard of 1899, snowfall in New Orleans reached  with strong winds and temperatures below .

2000: This snow was nationally televised as the 2000 Independence Bowl was being played on December 31, 2000 in Shreveport.  The game was later referred to as "The Snow Bowl", as a snowstorm (rare for the Shreveport area) began just before kickoff, blanketing the field in powder, and continued throughout the entire game.

2004: The 2004 Christmas Eve snowstorm swept across southern Texas and Louisiana, leaving unprecedented amounts of snow in areas that had not seen snow in 15 to 120 years.

2008: It snowed in and around semi-tropical New Orleans on Thursday December 11th, 2008.

From dawn to mid-morning a thick snowfall of plump, wet flakes buried much of southeast Louisiana, from Amite to Westwego, under a blanket of white.
Snow height:
Amite, LA:   Washington, LA:  Opelousas, LA:  Covington, LA:  Hammond, LA: 

2014: The early 2014 North American cold wave that blew through the eastern portion of the continental United States produced record low temperatures and brought freezing snow and sleet to Louisiana.

2017: Early in the morning on December 8, 2017, a winter storm dripped snowflakes on much of south Louisiana. Throughout the day, more and more snow fell. Snow lasted all day long. Most schools across Louisiana closed due to the snow.

2021: Significant snow and ice was reported nearly statewide on February 14–15, 2021 with the February 13–17, 2021 North American winter storm and again on February 17 from the February 15–20, 2021 North American winter storm.

State preparedness
Because of the scarcity of freezing temperatures in Louisiana, many citizens of the region are often left unprepared to handle what might be considered a storm of little consequence in more northern states. The region has developed a system of road and school closures with only minimal snowfall, as most drivers in the area are unprepared to deal with slick, frozen roads. In 2014, Gov. Bobby Jindal invoked the  Louisiana Homeland Security and Emergency Assistance and Disaster Act in advance of the weather and assembled teams to assist in preparation and recovery.

Louisiana's environment
The state's typically humid subtropical climate rarely encounters precipitation coupled with freezing temperatures. The low latitudes and proximity to the Gulf of Mexico helps maintain this climate, particularly closer to the coast. The normally extreme summers are rarely countered by cold winters, with snowfall low in intensity and frequency. Also the southern portions of the state typically has two seasons, a wet season from April to October and a dry season from November to March. The cooler season typically brings in very little precipitation, also limiting snowfall. Average winter temperature normals in southern Louisiana vary from the 40s to the 60s Fahrenheit. Natural disasters such as hurricanes are far more common, and such an ecosystem is ill prepared for snow, particularly the seafood supply on which Louisiana relies for much of its revenue. Little research has been done directly linking effects on Louisiana's ecosystem to snow conditions. However, the jet stream that created the 2014 North American cold wave has been linked to global warming, and resultant cold fronts have been linked to salt water intrusion in Louisiana's Atchafalaya Bay. However, one of Louisiana's most famous animals, the alligator, has proved versatile in adapting to cold weather conditions by burrowing in "alligator holes", which they usually use for waiting out a drought.  Studies conducted in Finland and Sweden suggest that snow creates more potential problems in urban communities due to increased pollution in runoff.  Due to the state's lack of resources and funding, however, it is unclear what levels of pollution due to snow affect the Louisiana area.

See also
Snow in Florida

References

External links

Louisiana Office of State Climatology. losc.lsu.edu
United Nations Environment Programme unep.org

Snow
Louisiana
Weather-related lists